Konstantin Svechkar (born 17 July 1984) is a Russian sprinter who specializes in the 400 metres.

Svechkar won bronze medals in 4 x 400 metres relay at the 2005 Universiade, together with teammates Dmitriy Petrov, Alexander Borshchenko and Vladislav Frolov, and at the 2006 World Indoor Championships with Aleksandr Derevyagin, Yevgeniy Lebedev and Dmitriy Petrov.

His personal best time is 46.09 seconds, achieved in July 2005 in Erfurt.

External links 

1984 births
Living people
Russian male sprinters
Universiade medalists in athletics (track and field)
Universiade bronze medalists for Russia
World Athletics Indoor Championships medalists
Medalists at the 2005 Summer Universiade
21st-century Russian people